Suthee Meanchainun (Minchaiynunt) is a Thai billionaire businessman, landowner, and philanthropist. He is an honourable lifetime President of Thai-Chinese Chamber of Commerce. Suthee is a major contributor between China–Thailand relations. He is of an aristocratic family of formerly Min Buri province- currently part of Bangkok.

Early life and family 
Suthee was born of Chinese ancestry in Min Buri. The Minchaiynunt family is widely known for rice mills and civil construction business since the late 1800s. They later became influential in the Eastern part of Bangkok due to their involvement in local and national politics.

Suthee's nephew Vicharn Minchainant was a former Deputy Minister of Public Health and a 4 time member of parliament (MP) serving Min Buri. Wirat Minchainant was a three time member of the Bangkok Metropolitan council serving Min Buri is also one of Suthee’s nephews.

Career
Suthee started his career in rice milling industry later in real estate development and civil engineering. Suthee is a director of Chainunt Construction, Thailand top ranked civil engineering company.

Suthee was accused of benefitting from the new BTS pink line planned due to his numerous patches of land around Min Buri in excess of 5,000 rais, or around 2,000 acres contributing his wealth. In 2005, the King of Thailand awarded him the country's one of the highest civilian decorations  "Dame Grand Cross of the Most Admirable" (First Class) of the "Order of the Direkgunabhorn".

Honors

Decorations
     Dame Grand Cross of the Most Admirable Order of the Direkgunabhorn

References 

Suthee Meanchainun
Living people
Year of birth missing (living people)
Suthee Meanchainun